In the area of abstract algebra known as ring theory, a left perfect ring is a type of ring in which all left modules have projective covers. The right case is defined by analogy, and the condition is not left-right symmetric; that is, there exist rings which are perfect on one side but not the other. Perfect rings were introduced in Bass's book.

A semiperfect ring is a ring over which every finitely generated left module has a projective cover. This property is left-right symmetric.

Perfect ring

Definitions
The following equivalent definitions of a left perfect ring R are found in Aderson and Fuller:
 Every left R module has a projective cover.
 R/J(R) is semisimple and J(R) is left T-nilpotent (that is, for every infinite sequence of elements of J(R) there is an n such that the product of first n terms are zero), where J(R) is the Jacobson radical of R.
 (Bass' Theorem P) R satisfies the descending chain condition on principal right ideals. (There is no mistake; this condition on right principal ideals is equivalent to the ring being left perfect.)
 Every flat left R-module is projective.
 R/J(R) is semisimple and every non-zero left R module contains a maximal submodule.
 R contains no infinite orthogonal set of idempotents, and every non-zero right R module contains a minimal submodule.

Examples
 Right or left Artinian rings, and semiprimary rings are known to be right-and-left perfect.
 The following is an example (due to Bass) of a local ring which is right but not left perfect. Let F be a field, and consider a certain ring of infinite matrices over F.
Also take the matrix  with all 1's on the diagonal, and form the set

It can be shown that R is a ring with identity, whose Jacobson radical is J. Furthermore R/J is a field, so that R is local, and R is right but not left perfect.

Properties
For a left perfect ring R:
 From the equivalences above, every left R module has a maximal submodule and a projective cover, and the flat left R modules coincide with the projective left modules.
 An analogue of the Baer's criterion holds for projective modules.

Semiperfect ring

Definition
 
Let R be ring. Then R is semiperfect if any of the following equivalent conditions hold:

 R/J(R) is semisimple and idempotents lift modulo J(R), where J(R) is the Jacobson radical of R.
 R has a complete orthogonal set e1, ..., en of idempotents with each ei R ei a local ring.
 Every simple left (right) R-module has a projective cover.
 Every finitely generated left (right) R-module has a projective cover.
 The category of finitely generated projective -modules is Krull-Schmidt.

Examples

Examples of semiperfect rings include:
 Left (right) perfect rings.
 Local rings.
 Kaplansky's theorem on projective modules
 Left (right) Artinian rings.
 Finite dimensional k-algebras.

Properties

Since a ring R is semiperfect iff every simple left R-module has a projective cover, every ring Morita equivalent to a semiperfect ring is also semiperfect.

Citations

References

 
 
 

Ring theory